Lee Julian Rogers (born 21 October 1966) is an English former professional footballer who played as a defender in the Football League for Chesterfield, in non-League football for Gainsborough Trinity, and was on the books of Doncaster Rovers without making a league appearance.

References

External links

1966 births
Living people
Footballers from Doncaster
English footballers
Association football defenders
Doncaster Rovers F.C. players
Chesterfield F.C. players
Gainsborough Trinity F.C. players
English Football League players